Blue Island (Italian title Due gocce d'acqua salata) is a 1982 film directed by Luigi Russo (under the pseudonym John Wilder) and Enzo Doria, who also co-wrote the screenplay with Dardano Sacchetti. Filmed in the Seychelles, it stars Fabio Meyer, Mario Pedone and Sabrina Siani. Like the film Paradise of the same year, it was inspired by the success of the 1980 release The Blue Lagoon.

Premise
After an airliner crashes over the ocean, two young passengers, Bonnie (Siani) and Billy (Meyer), meet in an inflatable life raft. Apparently the only survivors, they make it to a tropical island, but soon learn that they are not entirely alone.

References

1982 films
Italian drama films
1980s Italian-language films
Films shot in Seychelles
Films set on islands
1980s English-language films
1980s Italian films